Anteosaurus (meaning "Antaeus reptile") is an extinct genus of large carnivorous dinocephalian synapsid. It lived at the end of the Guadalupian (= Middle Permian) during the Capitanian stage, about 265 to 260 million years ago in what is now South Africa. It is mainly known by cranial remains and few postcranial bones. Occupying the top of the food chain in the Middle Permian, its skull, jaws and teeth show adaptations to capture large prey like the giants titanosuchids and tapinocephalids dinocephalians and large pareiasaurs.

As in many other dinocephalians the cranial bones of Anteosaurus are pachyostosed, but to a lesser extent than in tapinocephalid dinocephalians. In Anteosaurus, pachyostosis mainly occurs in the form of horn-shaped supraorbital protuberances. According to some paleontologists this structure would be implicated in intraspecific agonistic behaviour, including head-pushing probably during the mating season. On the contrary, other scientists believe that this pachyostosis served to reduce cranial stress on the bones of the skull when biting massive prey.

Young Anteosaurus started their life with fairly narrow and lean skulls, and as it grew up bones of the skull became progressively thickened (process known as pachyostosis), creating the characteristic robust skull roof of Anteosaurus. The study of its inner ear revealed that Anteosaurus was a largely terrestrial, agile predator with highly advanced senses of vision, balance and coordination. It was also very fast and would have been able to outrun competitors and prey alike thanks to its advanced adaptations. Its body was well-suited to projecting itself forward, both in hunting and evidently in head-butting.

Anteosaurus and all other dinocephalians became extinct about 260 million years ago in a mass extinction at the end of the Capitanian in which the large Bradysaurian pareiasaurs also disappeared. The reasons of this extinction are obscure, although some research have shown a temporal association between the extinction of dinocephalian and an important volcanism event in China (known as the Emeishan Traps).

Etymology 
Some confusion surrounds the etymology of the name Anteosaurus. It is often translated as meaning "before lizard", "previous lizard" or "primitive lizard", from the Latin prefix ante which means "before". The zoologist and  paleontologist David Meredith Seares Watson gave no explanation when he named Anteosaurus in 1921. According to Ben Creisler, the prefix does not come from the Latin ante, but would refer to a Giant of the Greek mythology, Antaios, which once Latinized give Antaeus or more rarely Anteus. The type specimen of Anteosaurus is an incomplete skull that Watson had initially classified in the genus Titanosuchus, named after the Titans of the Greek mythology. Once this specimen recognized as belonging to a different genus, the name dedicated to Antaeus established another connection with a giant of Greek mythology.

Description

Size 

Skull 

The main features of the skull are the massively pachyostosed postfrontals that form strong horn-like bosses projected laterally. A boss, characteristically oval in shape, is also present on the angular bone of the lower jaw. The morphology of this angular boss is different between each anteosaurids species. In Anteosaurus the boss is oval in shape, roughly the same thickness throughout its length, with blunt anterior and posterior edges. Some individuals may have also a jugal boss more of less pronounced. Like other anteosaurids, the postorbital bar is strongly curved anteroventrally in such way that the temporal fenestra undercuts the orbit. An additional typical character of anteosaurs is the premaxilla oriented upwards at an angle of about 30 to 35° with respect to the ventral edge of the maxilla. However, unlike most anteosaurs in which the ventral margin of the premaxilla is directed upwards in a straight line, in Anteosaurus the anterior end of the premaxilla is curved ventrally, producing a concave alveolar border of the region preceding the canines. The skull shows also a concave dorsal snout profile. On the top of the skull, the pineal boss is exclusively formed by the parietals as is the case in other anteosaurines (and in more basal anteosaurs such as Archaeosyodon and Sinophoneus) while this boss is made up of both frontals and parietals in the other anteosaur subgroup, the syodontines. Contrary to what is observed in the latter, the frontals and the pineal boss of the anteosaurines do not participate in the attachment site of the mandibular adductor musculature. On the palate, the transverse processes of pterygoids are massively enlarged at their distal end, giving them a palmate shape in ventral view, as is the case in Titanophoneus and Sinophoneus. As in other anteosaurs, two prominent palatal bosses carried several small teeth. In Anteosaurus (and in other anteosaurines), these two palatal bosses are well separated from each other while in syodontines the two bosses are very close or interconnected.

Dentition 
The dentition of Anteosaurus is composed of long to very long incisors, a large canine, and some small postcanines. In addition, some small teeth are present on both palatine bosses. There are five upper and four lower incisors, but even in the same skull the number in the two halves is mostly different. The incisors intermesh together. Like other anteosaurids, the first incisor of each premaxilla form together a pair that passes in between the lower pair formed by the first incisor of each dentary. The canines are well individualized. The upper canine is large and very massive, but is proportionally shorter than in some gorgonopsians of the Late Permian. The upper and lower canines did not intermesh. When the jaws were closed, the lower canines passed on the lingual side of the fifth upper incisor. Behind the canines, there are 4 to 8 small and relatively robust postcanines. Although smaller than the incisors and canines, these postcanines are proportionately more massive, with a thick base and a more conical general shape. Some postcanines of the upper jaws have a peculiar implantation. The most posterior are canted postero-laterally : the last three to four postcanine teeth are out-of-plane with the rest of the tooth row, being directed strongly backwards and somewhat outwards. Other smaller teeth were located on two prominences of the palate, the palatal bosses, which are semilunar or reniform in shape. These palatal teeth were recurved and most often implanted in a single curved row (a specimen however shows a double row). These teeth were used to hold meat during the swallowing process.

Postcranial skeleton 

Postcranial material of Anteosaurus is very rare and no complete skeletons are known. Only some associated or isolated bones (girdles and limbs bones, and some vertebrae), and more rarely some articulated remains have been found. An articulated left hand belonging to a juvenile individual shows that the manual phalangeal formula is 2-3-3-3-3 as in mammals. This hand (as well as an incomplete foot) was first considered by Lieuwe Dirk Boonstra as belonging to the right side of the animal. Boonstra himself corrected this mistake later by correctly identifying these remains as the left hand and foot. He also thought that digit III had four phalanges. Tim Rowe and J.A. van den Heever later showed that this was not the case, this digit having three phalanges. The manus have a digit I (the innermost) much smaller than the others. The digits III to V are the longest, the digit V (the outermost) being the most robust. The foot is only partially known, but also has a smaller digit I. Based on more complete skeletons of the Russian anteosaur Titanophoneus, the limbs would be rather long with a somewhat semi-erect posture. The tail is longer than in herbivorous Tapinocephalids dinocephalians.

Paleobiology

Skull variations and agonistic behaviour 

The numerous skulls of Anteosaurus show a wide range of variation in cranial proportions and extent of pachyostosis. Most specifically the development of the postfrontal "horns" and the frontal boss is particularly variable between specimens. Some have both the "horns" and the boss massively pachyostosed, others have well-developed "horns" but a weak or nonexistent boss, and some others have a very weakly developed "horns" and boss. Even the heavily pachyostosed specimens show between them some variations. Some have "horns" relatively small compared to the boss, while others have postfrontal "horns" very massive. Some of these variations can be attributed to ontogenetic changes. In adults specimens the variations of the development of the frontal boss (to very weak to very strong) can be a sexually dimorphic feature, because in dinocephalians the frontal bosses have been implicated in head-butting and pushing behaviour.

Various authors have suggested the existence of agonistic behavior in Anteosaurus based on head-butting and/or demonstration involving canines. According to Herbert H. Barghusen, Anteosaurus does not use its teeth during intraspecific combat because both animals were able of doing severe damage to each other with their massive canines and incisors. The alternative head pushing strategy reduced the risk of fatal injuries in both combatants. The contact area of the skull roof during head combat included the most posterior part of the nasal bones, part of the prefrontal, and the entire frontal and postfrontal on either side. The thickened and laterally extended postfrontals horn-like bosses reduced the chance of the head of one opponent slipping past the head of the other.

More recently, Julien Benoit and colleagues have shown that the head of Anteosaurus had a natural posture that was less tilted downwards than that of the tapinocephalids and that, unlike the latter, it does not line up ideally with the vertebral column to optimize a head-to-head combat. This peculiarity associated with the presence of a pachyostosis less developed than that of the tapinocephalids and the retention of a large canine led these authors to suggest an agonistic behavior in which Anteosaurus more likely used its large canines for displays and/or during confrontation involving bites.

According to Christian Kammerer, the pachyostosis of Anteosaurus would have mainly allowed the skull to resist the cranial stress generated by the powerful external adductor muscles during the bite on a large prey, as has been suggested in other macropredators with a thickened supraorbital region such as rubidgeine gorgonopsians, mosasaurs, some thalattosuchians, sebecosuchians, rauisuchians and various large carnivorous dinosaurs.

All these authors, however, do not exclude a multiple use of this pachyostosis and the existence in Anteosaurus of a head-butting behaviour requiring however less energy than that of the Tapinocephalidae.

Ontogeny
Ashley Kruger and team in 2016 described a juvenile specimen of Anteosaurus (BP/1/7074), providing details into the ontogeny of this anteosaurid. Analyzed allometry between this specimen and others suggests that the cranial ontogeny of Anteosaurus was characterized by a rapid growth in the temporal region, a significant difference in the development of the postorbital bar and suborbital bar between juveniles and adults, as well as a notorious pachyostosis (bone thickening) during development, which ultimately modified the skull roof of adults. Consequently, pachyostosis was responsible for thickening important skull bones such as the frontal and postfrontal which were of great importance in the overall paleobiology and behavior of Anteosaurus. Kruger and team noted that these differences, when compared, are extreme between juvenile and mature Anteosaurus individuals.

In 2021 Mohd Shafi Bhat histologically studied several skeletal remains of specimens referred to Anteosaurus, finding three growth stages. The first growth stage is characterized by the predominance of highly vascularized, uninterrupted fibrolamellar bone tissue in the inner bone cortex, which suggests rapid formation of new bone during early ontogeny. A second stage of growth in Anteosaurus is represented by periodic/seasonal interruptions in the bone formation, indicated by the deposition of lines of arrested growth. Third and last reported growth stage by the team features the development of lamellar bone tissue with rest lines in the peripheral part of the bone cortex, which indicates that Anteosaurus slowed down growth at advanced age.

Habitat preference and diet

Boonstra in 1954 indicated that the overall dentition of Anteosaurus—characterized by prominent canines, elongated incisors, and relatively weak postcanines—reflects an specialized carnivore, and that this anteosaurid did not rely on chewing and shearing when feeding, but rather it was well-adapted for tearing flesh chunks from prey. In addition, Boonstra noted that some of the flesh material was likely held and/or teared by the recurved palatal dentition. Later in 1955, Boonstra indicated that anteosaurids had a crawling locomotion similar to crocodiles, based mostly on their hip joint and femur morphology, useful in a semiaquatic setting.

In 2008 Mivah F. Ivakhnenko analyzed a vast majority of Permian therapsid skulls, and suggested that anteosaurs, such as Anteosaurus, were strict semiaquatic piscivorous (fish-eater) synapsids, mostly similar to modern-day otters. Christian F. Kammerer in 2011 questioned this proposal, given that numerous anatomical traits of anteosaurs make this life-style unlikely. The typical dentition of piscivore animals include elongate, numerous, strongly recurved, and very sharp teeth in order to hold and kill fast-moving fish prey. In addition, the jaws of piscivores are commonly elongated and narrow for quick snatchs and minimize water resistance when shaking prey. Unlike these traits, the skull morphology of most anteosaurs—specifically anteosaurids—is extremely robust with deep jaws, and the teeth are bulbous and blunt, with only the canine being the recurved-most tooth. Kammerer instead indicated that anteosaurids like Anteosaurus likely preyed on large terrestrial dinocephalians, such as the gigantic titanosuchids and tapinocephalids. He also noted that anteosaurid teeth are mostly similar to that of large tyrannosaurids (postcanines robust bases, faceted surfaces, and obliquely angled serrations), whose dentition is interpreted as bone-crunching. Accordingly, bone-crunching may also have been employed by anteosaurids and an important component in their diet.

In 2020 Kévin Rey with collagues analyzed stable oxygen isotope compositions of phosphate from teeth and bones from pareiasaurs and Anteosaurus, in order to estimate their affinity for water dependence. Obtained results showed similar δ18Op values between pareiasaurs, Anteosaurus, and therocephalians, with a wide range of extant terrestrial species, which indicated a terrestrial preference for these synapsids. However, it was noted that the δ18Op values were slightly lower in Anteosaurus, casting doubt for this interpretation. Nevertheless, Rey with colleagues concluded that a larger sample size may result in a more robust conclusion for Anteosaurus.

Bhat and team in 2021 noted that most skeletal elements of Anteoaurus are characterized by relatively thickened bone walls, extensive secondary bone reconstruction and the complete infilling of the medullary cavity. Combined, these traits indicate that Anteosaurus was mostly adapted for a terrestrial life-style. However a radius and femur have open medullary cavities with struts of bony trabeculae. The team suggested that it is conceable that Anteosaurus may have also occasionally inhabited shallow and short-lived pools, in a similar manner to modern-day hippopotamuses.

An in-depth study of the brain of juvenile Anteosaurus specimen BP/1/7074 published in 2021 disproves the idea that this dinocephalian was a sluggish, crocodilian-like predator. Studies by Benoit et al. using x-ray imaging and 3-D reconstructions showcase that Anteosaurus was a fast, agile animal in spite of its great size. Its inner ears were larger than those of its closest relatives and competitors, showcasing that it was well-suited to the role of an apex predator that could outrun both its rivals and prey alike. It was also determined that the area of the brain of Anteosaurus that was responsible for coordinating the movements of the eyes with the head was exceptionally large; an important feature in ensuring it could track its prey accurately. As a result, Anteosaurus was well-adapted to swift hunting and fast attacking strikes on land.

Geographic and stratigraphic range

South Africa

The fossils of Anteosaurus magnificus come mainly from the Abrahamskraal Formation as well as from the basal part of the Teekloof Formation of the Beaufort Group in the Karoo Basin, South Africa. The species appears in the middle part of the Abrahamskraal Formation (Kornplaats member) and continues in the rest of the formation (Swaerskraal, Moordenaars, and Kareskraal members). Its last representatives come from the base of the Teekloof formation (in the lower strata of the Poortjie member). More than 30 localities are known, most of them being localized in the Western Cape province (Beaufort West, Prince Albert and Laingsburg). Some localities are also known near the towns of Sutherland and Fraserburg in the southern end of the Northern Cape province (Karoo Hoogland). and at least one specimen (BP/1/7061) was found near Grahamstown in the Eastern Cape Province (Makana). A skull discovered in the same province in 2001 was also tentatively ascribed to a juvenile specimen of  Anteosaurus. However, the complete preparation of this skull, made later, revealed that it belonged to a tapinocephalid dinocephalian.

The Middle Permian Abrahamskraal Formation is biostratigraphically subdivided in two faunal zone : the Eodicynodon Assemblage Zone which is the oldest one with an essentially Wordian age, and the Tapinocephalus Assemblage Zone, which is mainly Capitanian in age. Anteosaurus belongs to the Tapinocephalus Assemblage Zone which is characterized by the abundance and the diversification of the dinocephalians therapsids. Since 2020, this zone is divided into two subzones : a lower Eosimops - Glanosuchus subzone and an upper Diictodon - Styracocephalus subzone, both of which contain Anteosaurus fossils. Like all other South African dinocephalians, Anteosaurus was presumed extinct at the top of the Abrahamskraal Formation. However, remains of Anteosaurus and two other dinocephalian genera (Titanosuchus and Criocephalosaurus) have been found in the basal portion of the Poortjie Member of the overlying Teekloof Formation. These discoveries greatly expanded both the stratigraphic range of these three dinocephalian genera and the upper limit of the Tapinocephalus Assemblage Zone that reaches the base of the Teekloof Formation. Other radiometric dating have constrained the base of the Tapinocephalus Assemblage Zone (Leeuvlei Member in the middle part of the Abrahamskraal Formation) to be older than 264.382 ± 0.073 Ma and placed the boundary between the two subzones at 262.03 ± 0.15 Ma. The upper part of the Abrahamskraal Formation (top of the Karelskraal Member) gave an age of 260.226 ± 0.069 Ma which is consistent with the age of 260.259 ± 0.081 of the base of the Teekloof Formation. These datings show that the age of the Tapinocephalus Assemblage Zone extends from Late Wordian to Late Capitanian (based on Guadalupian radiometric ages obtained in 2020 from the type locality of the Guadalupe Mountains in west Texas).

Russia ?
The genus Anteosaurus is possibly present in Russia based on a fragmentary cranial remain found in the 19th century in the Republic of Tatarstan (Alexeyevsky District). This specimen, firstly interpreted as a snout boss of a dicynodont (named Oudenodon rugosus), was later correctly identified by Ivan Efremov as an angular boss of an anteosaurid. The shape of this boss clearly differs from those of others Russian anteosaurids, so this specimen was attributed to a new species of the genus Titanophoneus (and named Titanophoneus rugosus). More recently, Christian Kammerer showed that the shape of this boss differs markedly from the lenticular bosses of the Russian anteosaurs T. potens and T. adamanteus. In contrast the angular boss of T. rugosus is very similar to the Anteosaurus morphotype, so this specimen can be the first representative of the genus Anteosaurus in Russia. The dermal sculturing of the boss, with prominent furrows, is different from that observed in few well preserved A. magnificus specimens. According to Kammerer, as the range of variation in dermal sculturing between Anteosaurus individuals is no well known, it is more reasonable to consider provisionally Titanophoneus rugosus as a nomen dubium (maybe an Anteosaurus sp.). Only the discovery of more complete Russians specimens with the rugosus morphotype will clarify the relationship of this taxon with Anteosaurus.

Paleoenvironment

Paleogeography and paleoclimate

At the time of Anteosaurus, most of the landmasses were united in one supercontinent, Pangaea. It was roughly C-shaped: its northern (Laurasia) and southern (Gondwana) parts were connected to the west, but separated to the east by a very large oceanic bay - the Tethys Sea. A long string of microcontinents, grouped under the name of Cimmeria, divided the Tethys in two : the Paleo-Tethys in the north, and the Neo-Tethys in the south. The territory that would become the South African Karoo was located much further south than today, at the level of the 60th parallel south. Although located close to the Antarctic Circle, the climate prevailing at this latitude during most of the Permian was temperate with distinct seasons.  There are uncertainties about the temperatures that prevailed in South Africa during the Middle Permian. Previously, this region of the world had undergone significant glaciation during the Upper Carboniferous. Subsequently, the Lower Permian had first seen the retreat of glaciers and the emergence of subpolar tundra and taiga-like vegetation (dominated by Botrychiopsis and Gangamopteris), then the introduction of warmer and wetter climatic conditions that allowed the development of the Mesosaurus fauna and the Glossopteris flora. The scientists who studied the climate of that time found very different results on the thermal ranges that existed in the ancient Karoo. At the end of the 1950s, Edna Plumstead compared the Karoo to today's Siberia or Canada, with a highly seasonal climate including very cold winters and temperate summers supporting the Glossopteris flora, which would have been restricted to sheltered basins. Later, other studies, mainly based on climate models, also suggested a cold temperate climate with high thermal amplitude between summer (+15 to +20 °C) and winter (-20 to -25 °C). More recent studies also indicate a temperate climate, but with much less severe winters than those previously suggested. Keddy Yemane thus suggested that the vast river system and the many giant lakes present at the time throughout southern Africa must have significantly moderated the continentality of the Karoo climate during most of the Permian. Paleobotanical studies focusing on the characteristic morphology of plant leaves and the growth rings of fossil woods also indicate a seasonal climate with summer temperatures of up to 30 °C and free-frost winters. According to Richard Rayner, the high southern latitudes experienced very hot and humid summers, with an average of 18 hours of light per day for more than four months during which precipitation was comparable to the annual amount falling in the present-day tropics. These conditions were extremely conducive to rapid growth in plants such as Glossopteris. The habit in Glossopteris of losing its leaves at the beginning of the bad season would be linked to a shorter duration of daylight rather than the existence of very cold winter temperatures. From the geochemical study of sediments from several Karoo sites, Kay Scheffler also obtains a temperate climate (with mean annual temperatures of about 15 to 20 °C), with free-frost winter, but with an increase in aridity during the Middle Permian.

Paleoecology

The sediments of the Abrahamskraal Formation consists of a succession of sandstones, and versicolor siltstones and mudstones, deposited by large rivers that flowed from south to north from the Gondwanide mountain range. These large rivers of variable sinuosity drained a vast alluvial plain that sloped gently down to the northeast toward the Ecca sea (a former landlocked sea), while in receding phase. The landscape was composed of marshy land, interrupted by rivers, lakes, woods and forests. Many fossil traces (footprints, ripple marks, mudcracks) indicate that swampy areas, which were the most extensive habitat, were frequently exposed to the open air and should not often be deeply flooded. The vegetation was dominated by the deciduous pteridosperm Glossopteris, which formed woodlands and large forests concentrated along the streams and on the uplands. Large horsetails ( high), such as Schizoneura and Paraschizoneura, formed bamboo-like stands that grew in and around swamps. Herbaceous horsetails (Phyllotheca) and ferns carpeted the undergrowth and small lycopods occupied the wetter areas.

Aquatic fauna included the lamellibranch Palaeomutela, the palaeonisciformes fishes Atherstonia, Bethesdaichthys, Blourugia, Namaichthys and Westlepis, and large freshwater predators, the temnospondyl amphibians Rhinesuchoides and Rhinesuchus. The terrestrial fauna was particularly diverse and dominated by the therapsids. Anteosaurus occupied the top of the food chain there. It shared its environment with many other carnivorous tetrapods. Other large predatory animals included the lion-sized Lycosuchid therocephalians Lycosuchus and Simorhinella, and the Scylacosaurid therocephalian Glanosuchus. Medium-sized carnivorous were represented by the basal biarmosuchian Hipposaurus, the more derived biarmosuchian Bullacephalus, the scylacosaurids Ictidosaurus, Scylacosaurus, and Pristerognathus, and the small and basal gorgonopsian Eriphostoma. The small predator guild (mainly insectivorous forms) included the therocephalians Alopecodon, and Pardosuchus, the small monitor-like varanopids Elliotsmithia, Heleosaurus, and Microvaranops, the millerettid Broomia, the procolophonomorph Australothyris, and the lizard-like Eunotosaurus of uncertain affinities (variously considered as a parareptile, a pantestudine or a caseid synapsid).

Herbivorous were also numerous and diversified. Large-sized vegetarians were mainly represented by numerous dinocephalians including the tapinocephalids Agnosaurus, Criocephalosaurus, Mormosaurus, Moschognathus, Moschops, Riebeeckosaurus, Struthiocephalus Struthionops, and Tapinocephalus, the Styracocephalid Styracocephalus, and the huge titanosuchids Jonkeria and Titanosuchus. Other large herbivores that were not synapsids included the large bradysaurian pareiasaurs represented by Bradysaurus, Embrithosaurus and Nochelesaurus, whose dentition very different from that of herbivorous dinocephalians indicates that the two groups occupied clearly distinct ecological niches. The small to medium-sized forms included basal anomodonts (the non-dicynodonts Anomocephalus, Galechirus, Galeops and Galepus) and numerous dicynodonts (Brachyprosopus, Colobodectes, Pristerodon, and the Pylaecephalids Diictodon, Eosimops, Prosictodon, and Robertia,).

Classification and phylogeny 
Named by Watson in 1921, Anteosaurus was longtime classified as a ‘Titanosuchian Deinocephalian’, and it is only in 1954 that Boonstra separated the Titanosuchians in two families : Jonkeridae (a junior synonym of Titanosuchidae) and Anteosauridae. At about the same time, Efremov erected the family Brithopodidae in which he includes the fragmentary Brithopus and the better known forms Syodon and Titanophoneus. Much later, Hopson and Barghusen argued that Brithopodidae should be discontinued and that the Russian taxa Syodon, Titanophoneus and Doliosauriscus should be placed with Anteosaurus in Anteosauridae. These authors placed also Anteosauridae in the new group Anteosauria for distinguished them of the other major dinocephalian group the Tapinocephalia in which they included the titanosuchids and the tapinocephalids. They also created the taxa Anteosaurinae, containing Anteosaurus and the Russian forms Titanophoneus and Doliosauriscus, and the Anteosaurini containing only the giant forms Anteosaurus and Doliosauriscus. Gilian King retained the incorrectly spelled ‘Brithopidae’ (including the subfamilies ‘Brithopinae’ and Anteosaurinae) and placed both Brithopidae and Titanosuchidae (including Titanosuchinae and Tapinocephalinae) in the superfamily Anteosauroidea. Later Ivakhnenko considered Brithopodidae as invalid and united Anteosauridae and Deuterosauridae (only known by the Russian Deuterosaurus) in the superfamily Deuterosauroidea. More recently Kammerer in its systematic revision of the anteosaurs (in which Doliosauriscus become a junior synonym of Titanophoneus) demonstrated that the wastebasket genus Brithopus is a nomen dubium composed both of remains of indeterminate estemmenosuchid-like tapinocephalian and indeterminate anteosaurian, so invalidating the Brithopodidae. He proposed also the first phylogenetic analysis including all anteosaurid taxa. This and other modern phylogenetic analysis of anteosaurs recovers a monophyletic Anteosauridae containing two major clades, Syodontinae and Anteosaurinae. In the Kammerer analysis, the Chinese Sinophoneus is the most basal anteosaurine and the sister-group of an unresolved trichotomy including Titanophoneus potens, T. adamanteus and Anteosaurus. 
 
Below the cladogramm of Kammerer published in 2011 :

In describing the new Brazilian anteosaur Pampaphoneus, Cisneros et al. presented another cladogram confirming the recognition of the clades Anteosaurinae and Syodontinae. In the cladogram of the Fig. 2. of the main paper, which does not include the genus Microsyodon, Titanophoneus adamanteus is recovered as the sister taxon of a clade composed of Titanophoneus potens and Anteosaurus. However, in the four cladograms of the Fig. S1, presented in the Supporting Information of the same article, and including Microsyodon, Anteosaurus is recovered as the sister taxon of both species of Titanophoneus. These four cladograms differ only by the position of Microsyodon.

The cladogram of Cisneros et al. published in the main paper and excluding the genus Microsyodon. T. adamanteus is here the sister taxon of a clade composed of T. potens and Anteosaurus :

One of the four cladograms of Cisneros et al. published in the Supporting Information of the same article, and including Microsyodon. In all these cladogram, Anteosaurus is recovered as the sister taxon of both species of Titanophoneus :

In resdescribing the Chinese anteosaur Sinophoneus, Jun Lui presented a new cladogram in which Sinophoneus is recovered as the most basal Anteosauridae and so excluded of the Anteosaurinae. Anteosaurus being also positioned as the sister-taxon of Titanophoneus potens and T. adamanteus.

The cladogramm of Jun Liu in 2013:

Genus synonymy
As defined by Lieuwe Dirk Boonstra, Anteosaurus is “a genus of anteosaurids in which the postfrontal forms a boss of variable size overhanging the dorso-posterior border of the orbit.” On this basis he synonymised six of the seven genera named from the Tapinocephalus zone: Eccasaurus, Anteosaurus, Titanognathus, Dinosuchus, Micranteosaurus, and Pseudanteosaurus. Of these, he says, Dinosuchus and Titanognathus can safely be considered synonyms of Anteosaurus. Eccasaurus, with a holotype of which the cranial material consists of only few typical anteosaurid incisors, appears to be only determinable as to family. The skull fragment forming the holotype of Pseudanteosaurus can best be considered as an immature specimen of Anteosaurus. Micranteosaurus, the holotype of which contains a small snout, was previously considered a new genus on account of its small size but is better be interpreted as a young specimen of Anteosaurus. And likewise, the large number of species attributed to the genus Anteosaurus can also be considered synonyms. Boonstra still considers as valid the genus Paranteosaurus, which is defined as a genus of anteosaurids in which the postfrontal is not developed to form a boss. This is probably an example of individual variation and hence another synonym of Anteosaurus.

Species synonymy

Anteosaurus was once known by a large number of species, but the current thinking on this is that they merely represent different growth stages of the same type species, A. magnificus.

{{Quote|We have 32 skulls of Anteosaurus, of which 16 are reasonably well preserved and on them ten species have been named. To differentiate between the species the following main characters have. been used: the number, size and shape of the teeth, skull size, shape and the nature of the pachyostosis. On re-examination it has become clear that the crowns of the teeth are seldom well preserved; basing the count for the dental formula on the preserved roots is unreliable. as this is affected by age and tooth generation; size of skull is a function of age and also possibly sex; skull shape is greatly affected by post-mortem deformation, and the variability in the pachyostosis, which may be specific in some respects, can just as well be the result of...physiological processes. Specific diagnosis consisting of the enumeration of differences of degree in features such as the above can hardly be considered as sufficient indication of the existence of discrete species....A. magnificus thus has the following synonyms: abeli, acutirostrus, crassifrons, cruentus, laticeps, levops, lotzi, major, minor, minusculus, parvus, priscus and vorsteri.|Boonstra.

Possible synonyms

Archaeosuchus
Archaeosuchus cairncrossi is a dubious species of anteosaur from the Tapinocephalus Assemblage Zone. It was named by Broom in 1905 on the basis of a partial maxilla. It was interpreted as a titanosuchid by Boonstra, but Kammerer determined it was an anteosaur indistinguishable from Anteosaurus and Titanophoneus. As Anteosaurus magnificus appears to be the only valid large anteosaur in the Tapinocephalus Assemblage Zone, Archaeosaurus cairncrossi is very likely to be based on a specimen of it, but due to poor preservation, the specimen lacks any features that would allow the synonymy to be proven.

Eccasaurus
Eccasaurus priscus is a dubious species of anteosaur from the Tapinocephalus Assemblage Zone. It was named by Robert Broom in 1909 on the basis of a fragmentary skeleton, of which Broom only described the humerus. As with Archaeosuchus cairncrossi, Eccasaurus priscus is very likely to be synonymous with Anteosaurus magnificus. As Eccasaurus was named before Anteosaurus, a petition to the ICZN would be needed to preserve the name Anteosaurus magnificus if the synonymy were to be proven.

See also

 List of therapsids

Notes

References

External links
 
 

Anteosaurs
Prehistoric therapsid genera
Guadalupian synapsids of Africa
Fossil taxa described in 1921
Taxa named by D. M. S. Watson